Monivong Bridge (Khmer: ស្ពានព្រះមុនីវង្ស) is a heavily trafficked bridge in Phnom Penh, Cambodia. It bridges the Bassac River near the end of National Highway 2 to southern Cambodia and lies along the National Highway 1 which connects the city to eastern Cambodia and Vietnam.

On the eastern shore lies the Chhba Ampeou Market.

Images

References

Bassac River
Road bridges in Phnom Penh
Transport in Phnom Penh
Bridges completed in 2009